Shahrzad Rafati is an Iranian Canadian Chairperson and CEO of BroadbandTV Corp, a digital media and technology company that helps content creators monetize.

In October 2020, Rafati led BBTV to its initial public offering on the Toronto Stock Exchange.

Early life
Rafati was born 1979 in Tehran, Iran and immigrated to Vancouver, British Columbia, Canada as a teenager. In 2005, she completed her BSc in computer science at the University of British Columbia. Rafati also studied French at Université Paris Sorbonne (Paris IV), and is a graduate of the Young Global Leaders Oxford Module: Transformational Leadership at Saïd Business School, University of Oxford. Shahrzad also received her Honorary Doctorate from University Canada West in 2020.

Career
Rafati founded BroadbandTV in 2005 and has led it since then, garnering a 2013 $36 million investment from RTL Group. In October 2020, Shahrzad also led BBTV through its initial public offering on the TSX.

Separate from her role at BroadbandTV, Rafati is also a board member for a number of organizations including Bjarke Ingels Group, an architecture firm, as well as Vice Chair of the board at Invest in Canada. She has also been a board member of the Vancouver Economic Commission, and the Forum for Women Entrepreneurs.

In September 2018, it was announced that Shahrzad was appointed by Prime Minister Justin Trudeau to represent Canada on the Business Women Leaders task force, which was formed to advise global leaders on issues of women's economic empowerment as part of the G20 Summit. She was later appointed as Canada's representative for G20 EMPOWER, a private sector alliance with the goal of advancing women's representation at leadership levels in the private sector. In 2019 she was also appointed as the Vice Chair of Invest in Canada, a federal agency that aims to create jobs in Canada by facilitating foreign business investment by highlighting Canada's diverse and skilled talent pool, economic growth across multiple industries, and geographic advantage as a hub for global trade.

Awards 
Rafati has been the recipient of many awards and honors, including Canada's Top 40 under 40, the Top 25 Canadian Immigrant Award, Person of the Year by BC Technology Association, CEO of the Year by Business in Vancouver, and Fast Company's 100 Most Creative People in Business.

In 2022, Rafati was named on Business in Vancouver's list of Most Influential Women in Business. BC Business named Rafati the winner in the Entrepreneurial Leader category of the 2022 Women of the Year Awards.

References

External links

1979 births
Iranian broadcasters
Iranian emigrants to Canada
Women corporate executives
Canadian women company founders
Businesspeople from Vancouver
People from Tehran
Living people
Paris-Sorbonne University alumni
University of British Columbia Faculty of Science alumni
Naturalized citizens of Canada